Christie George (born 10 May 1984) is a Nigerian former footballer who played as a forward.

She was part of the Nigeria women's national football team  at the 2008 Summer Olympics.

See also
 Nigeria at the 2008 Summer Olympics

References

External links
 
 
 
 http://www.soccerpunter.com/players/19456-Christie-George
 http://www.gettyimages.com/photos/nigeria-christie-george?excludenudity=true&sort=mostpopular&mediatype=photography&phrase=nigeria%20christie%20george

1984 births
Living people
Nigerian women's footballers
Nigeria women's international footballers
Place of birth missing (living people)
Footballers at the 2008 Summer Olympics
Olympic footballers of Nigeria
Women's association football forwards
2007 FIFA Women's World Cup players
Pelican Stars F.C. players
21st-century Nigerian women